Fired Up! is a 2009 American teen sex comedy film directed by Will Gluck (in his directorial debut)  who is also credited with writing the film under the pseudonym Freedom Jones. The film's plot revolves around two popular high school football players who decide to attend a cheerleading camp for the summer to get close to its 300 female cheerleaders. The film was released on February 2, 2009 by Screen Gems. The film received mixed-to-negative reviews from critics and audiences and was a commercial flop, having grossed $18.5 million against a $20 million budget.

Plot
Nick Brady and Shawn Colfax are two popular football players at the fictional Gerald R. Ford High School who manage to get out of football camp and later con their way into the cheerleading squad after overhearing a conversation about the camp's abundant female population of three hundred cheerleaders. Their objective is to infiltrate the cheerleading camp in order to meet girls. While attending a cheer camp, Nick and Shawn realize that they actually enjoy cheering and they start to care about their squad as well as the cheer competition. Shawn develops feelings for the head cheerleader, Carly Davidson, and Nick chases after Diora, their camp coach's wife.

Carly and the rest of the squad soon find out about the boys' true motives for attending cheer camp. Carly's boyfriend, Dr. Rick, also reveals that Nick and Shawn initially planned to leave cheer camp before the cheer competition. They leave camp after being ejected from the squad. While attending a party at their friend's house, the guys discover that they are genuinely fond of cheer camp and want their squad to succeed. They decide to return to cheer camp and help the squad in the cheer competition.

While the guys are doing their routine, Carly notices Rick is cheating on her with their rivals' head cheerleader, Gwyneth. Shawn and Carly later focus all of their attention to the routine. The squad's routine results in their best finish yet, with a perfect attempt at executing the "Fountain of Troy" maneuver. However, when the squad go for executing the forbidden maneuver, Shawn accidentally goes for a triple backflip instead of a double like Carly and backflips into the water in front of them. The crowd gasps at the impact and the squad rushes to help, but Shawn manages to emerge and yells "Tigers!" before losing consciousness. Although the squad did not win the contest, they place ten spots better than they did last year. The film ends when Nick and Shawn end up with their love interests, with Shawn and Carly kissing each other.

Cast

Production

Filming locations
Taking place in Illinois, almost all of the filming shots of the high school in the film were taken at South Pasadena High School in 2008. However, the hallway scene was filmed at John Burroughs High School in Burbank, California. To make filming easier, the fictional Gerald R. Ford High School's mascot was made the "Tigers" since South Pasadena High's mascot is a tiger. Some of the South Pasadena Tigers Football team's gear such as pads, were borrowed for use in the film. However, filming for the football game scene took place at Calabasas High School. The filming of the pool scene took place at Long Beach Polytechnic High School.  The cheerleader camp was filmed at Occidental College, which incidentally also has the tiger as a mascot. In one of the early scenes, the train passing by is the  Metro Gold Line (LACMTA) Pasadena line. The location where the cheerleaders were practicing was filmed in the Los Angeles County Arboretum and Botanic Garden.

Reception

Critical response 
When the film was released, it was screened to negative reviews. Rotten Tomatoes gave the film a rating of 24% based on 107 reviews, with an average score of 4.10/10. The site's consensus states: "Though not as raunchy or juvenile as the average teen comedy, Fired Up is also not as funny." Metacritic gave the film a "generally unfavorable" score of 31% based on a normalized average of 18 reviews. A common criticism, addressed by director Will Gluck in the film's commentary track, is that the filmmakers "casted a little bit older." Star Eric Christian Olsen adds, "If by 'older,' you mean thirteen years!" Lead actors Olsen and Nicholas D'Agosto were playing high school students at the ages 30 and 27 at the time of filming, respectively. Gluck also points out Roger Ebert's and the New York Times's negative reviews specifically, as well as a mention of The Washington Post. He, however, omits the Washington Post's backhanded compliment that "Gluck directs with frantic, go-for-broke pacing, which is what you do when your reserves of wit are bankrupt." One of the more positive reviews, from Hollywood.com, admits it's satisfying for the audience it's aimed towards: "An outrageous, sex-obsessed teen comedy that’s something to cheer about -- especially if you’re 16."

Box office 
The film was considered financially unsuccessful. Fired Up! had a budget of $20 million and took in a box office gross of $18,599,102 worldwide before leaving theaters. It opened up to the U.S. box office at number 9 with $5.4 million behind films like Paul Blart: Mall Cop, which was in its sixth week of release at the time, and Confessions of a Shopaholic, in its second. On the DVD commentary, the business it did (or lack thereof) is discussed, with director Will Gluck stating, "In retrospect, we probably should have done R, but I kind of like the idea of doing a movie that everyone can go see, and not just 'over 18 or have to sneak into it.'" It left American cinemas after seven weeks.

Home media

The movie was released on DVD, UMD, and Blu-ray formats June 9, 2009. An unrated version was also released containing non-censored profanity and brief nudity not seen in the theatrical cut. Canadian singer Avril Lavigne's song "Girlfriend" was on the film's  soundtrack.

References

External links

 
 
 
 

2009 films
2009 comedy films
2009 directorial debut films
2000s American films
2000s English-language films
2000s high school films
2000s teen sex comedy films
American high school films
American sex comedy films
American teen comedy films
Cheerleading films
Films directed by Will Gluck
Films scored by Richard Gibbs
Films set in Illinois
Films shot in Los Angeles
Screen Gems films